Pine Mills is an unincorporated settlement in Wood County, Texas located at the intersection of Farm To Market Roads 14, 49, and 312 approximately ten miles southeast of the county seat of Quitman in the southeastern portion of the county. The community is alternately known as Liberty Hill and Reedsville.

Early history
Slightly southeast of Pine Mills location, a sawmill community named Liberty Hill had been established as early as 1850. R.A. Walton operated a gristmill in the area in the during this time. As of 1854, the Holly Springs Baptist Church of Christ was meeting at a facility known as the Liberty Hill Meeting House or Liberty Hill Chapel. A school was reported to be part of the settlement by 1855. A pottery manufacturing operation was in the area as early as 1860.

In the early 1870s, the community was known by the name Reedsville, allegedly for a local sawmill owner named Richard G. (Dick) Reed. The Pine Mills post office was established in July, 1875, and Reed was installed as postmaster. The community's official name was changed at that time from Reedsville to Pine Mills. Reed's daughter, Sarah Tennie Reed, married Joseph Shields in 1871, and he later operated the Shields-Lindley sawmill with George Lindley on the Pine Mills to Mount Pisgah road.

Later Development 
In 1884, Pine Mills reported a population of 130, a school, two churches, and several businesses including a blacksmith, carpenters, two cotton gins, and a number of sawmills. D.V. Wagoner came to Pine Mills this same year and operated a general merchandise store; he was also a dentist and undertaker.

Dr. Robert O. Connell came to the community around 1890 and practiced medicine in Pine Mills. Population reached 250 by 1892, and eleven businesses including two physicians were noted. A Church of Christ was organized in the community sometime before 1892.

Zenith, Decline and Re-Emergence 
In 1904, population was noted at 222; by the next year, the majority of the local timber supply had been depleted and the sawmills had left the community. The post office closed in 1907, and population was near 40 as of 1910. During the 1930s, the community was served by the Liberty school district and had a few businesses, among them a factory. Honey became a noted cash crop in the area after 1930, and specialty crop farming increased in the area as well.

Population had climbed to 80 by 1943. The discovery of the Pine Mills Oilfield in 1949 did not have much effect on the area's declining economy. Population dwindled to 70 by the mid 1960s.

References 

Unincorporated communities in Wood County, Texas
Unincorporated communities in Texas